Pournami is a 2006 Telugu language action musical dance film directed by Prabhu Deva and produced by M. S. Raju,starring Trisha in the titular role with Prabhas, Charmy, Sindhu Tolani, and Rahul Dev. The music was composed by Devi Sri Prasad with editing by Krishna Reddy and cinematography by Venu. The film was released on 21 April 2006.

The film was dubbed into Tamil and Malayalam under the same name and into Hindi as Tridev: Pyar Ki Jung (2008). The film was partly inspired by the 2001 Brazilian film Behind the Sun starring Rodrigo Santoro which in itself was adapted from an Albanian novel Broken April by Ismail Kadare. Shooting locations included Virupaksha Temple, elephant stables, and Stepwell in Hampi.

Plot
The film starts in 1953 and is set in a remote village in Andhra Pradesh where Subhramanyam (Chandra Mohan) is teaching his daughter, Pournami, dance. He tells her a story of how in 1507, the village was suffering from a drought for a very long time. A woman (Veda Sastry) from a traditional family comes forward to dance in the temple to ask Shiva to bless their village with rain. She dances continuously for seven days and nights until she dies of exhaustion. It rains, and the longstanding drought ends. Since then, there is a tradition in the village that a girl from that dancer's family, like Pournami's mother in 1951, should dance in Shiva's temple every 12 years, on that auspicious day.

10 years later, 1963, the villagers are expecting Pournami (Trisha) to dance. Unfortunately, 8 lunar months before the festival, she goes missing and everybody thinks that she eloped with someone. Then, everyone's attention turns to Pournami's younger sister Chandrakala (Charmy) to dance, but Subhramanyam disagrees. Meanwhile, Chandrakala's stepmother (Manju Bhargavi) rents their penthouse and courtyard, where Pournami used to dance, to Siva Kesava (Prabhas), a western-style dance instructor. Later, it is revealed that Pournami has not eloped, but her father sent her away to protect her from their zamindar, Veerabhadra (Rahul Dev) who wants to make Pournami his concubine. Fearing that the same fate might befall Chandrakala, he does not agree to teach her dancing. Sivakesava shows a necklace to Subhramanyam, which shocks him, and then promises to protect her from the zamindar. At this, she begins her studies.

Sivakesava beats up Chandrakala's catcaller (Ajay) and then Veerabhadra, influencing Chandrakala to go from hating to loving him. When he does not reciprocate him, he reveals his past. In a flashback, he reveals that he and Pournami married, and that she had sacrificed herself to save his life. Pournami tells him her dying wish: her sister should dance in the temple to keep the tradition alive. He promises her that he will make it happen. After learning of her sister's fate, Chandrakala agrees to learn the dance with her father's blessings. Kesava promises them that he would protect her from Veerabhadra, and he saves her when Veerabhadra tries to abduct her. She tries hard and becomes a skilled dancer in a very short time. Finally, she performs ardently in the temple, and again, their village is blessed with rains. After some drama involving Veerabhadra’s and Kesava's fiancée Mallika (Sindhu Tolani), Chandrakala and Kesava become one.

After a few years, Kesava and Chandrakala get married and have a daughter named Pournami. However, the daughter does not want to learn the dance. The film ends with Kesava narrating the tradition to the daughter in the temple.

Cast

Prabhas as Shiva Keshava Naidu, Narasimha Naidu's son, Pournami & Chandrakala's husband, Jr.Pournami's father
Trisha as Pournami, Chandrakala's elder sister,Shiva Keshava's love interest & first wife 
Charmy Kaur as Chandrakala,Pournami's younger sister,Shiva Keshava's second wife, Jr.Pournami's mother
Rahul Dev as Veerabhadra, the village Zamindar
Sindhu Tolani as Mallika
Mukesh Rishi as Narasimha Naidu (Kesava's father)
Geetha as Kesava's mother
Madhu Sharma as Mohini
Kota Srinivasa Rao as Nagendra Naidu
Chandra Mohan as Subhramanyam, Pournami & Chandrakala's father
Manju Bhargavi as Pournami's stepmother
Sunil as Pandu, Pournami's adoptive brother
Tanikella Bharani as Mallika's father, Kesava's maternal uncle
Sana as Mallika's mother, Kesava's aunt
Veda Sastry as Pournami and Chandrakala's ancestress
Harsha Vardhan as Pournami and Chandrakala's step-uncle
Subbaraju as Nagendra's youngest son
Brahmaji as Nagendra's middle son
Sravan as Nagendra's eldest son
Narsing Yadav as Mallika's servant
Mallikarjuna Rao as Priest
Prabhas Sreenu as Tea Seller
Ajay as Chandrakala's catcaller
Paruchuri Venkateswara Rao as Peddaiah, Pournami's adoptive father
Narra Venkateswara Rao
G. V. Sudhakar Naidu as the tea seller who poisons Kesava

Music

The music and background score was composed by Devi Sri Prasad and the lyrics were written by Sirivennela Sitaramasastri. The track 'Bharata Vedamuga' was set in raag Chandrakauns

Awards
Nandi Award for Best Art Director - Ashok (2006)

References

External links
 

2006 films
Films directed by Prabhu Deva
Indian dance films
Films scored by Devi Sri Prasad
2000s Telugu-language films
Indian remakes of foreign films